Vystavochnaya is a station on the Filyovskaya Line of the Moscow Metro. It was opened on 10 September 2005, and was called Delovoy Tsentr ("Business Centre") before 1 June 2009.

The high-tech design, which was the work of architects Aleksandr Vigdorov, Leonid Borzenkov, and Olga Farstova, is a radical departure from previous Metro stations.

The station is built on two levels, with the platform on the lower level. The upper level consists of two walkways which span the length of the platform. One walkway, the larger one, is enclosed in glass and sweeps from one side of the station to the other and back in a large arc. The other walkway is open and straight, running directly above the inbound track. The D-shaped area between the two walkways  extends to the full height of the station. The two rows of pillars span both levels and are clad in stainless steel. The walls are faced with white plastic panels and brown marble, and Alucobond was used for the ceiling.

The entrance to the station is built into the lower level of Moscow International Business Center (Moscow-City), near the north bank of the Moskva River, also serving access to Moscow Expocenter.

In the upper level of the station before you go through the turn styles can be found the public museum to the  Moscow Metro. It is free to enter and has photos and displays of memorabilia and artwork  spanning the ages. There is also a train cab simulator.

Transfer
Passengers at Vystavochnaya are able to transfer to Delovoy Tsentr of the Kalininsko–Solntsevskaya line. A third station, that allow transfers to the Bolshaya Koltsevaya line.

Gallery

References

Moscow Metro stations
Railway stations in Russia opened in 2005
Moscow International Business Center
Filyovskaya Line
Railway stations located underground in Russia